Stockwell (originally Bodega) was a startup company launched by former Google employees Paul McDonald and Ashwath Rajan. The idea behind the company was to build 5-foot-wide "pantry boxes" that contain non-perishable food and other items similar to those found in a convenience store, with Payment via a mobile app that charges the customer by credit card. The machines would use artificial intelligence to determine the 100 most commonly-purchased items and switch items if necessary. As of 2017, the company had installed 50 locations in San Francisco.

Plans were to place the machines in places like gyms, apartment lobbies, and offices, and to build enough machines that a customer is always within 100 feet of one.

Controversy
There was a major Twitter backlash against the concept when it was announced that machines would be installed in New York. Critics claimed that the startup could put real traditional New York bodegas out of business, and that use of the term "bodega" for the machine was culturally insensitive. There were also accusations of gentrification of New York neighborhoods. It was also claimed that the concept was similar enough to a vending machine or automat as to not be innovative. Mandatory credit card usage and cameras around the machines raised privacy concerns. The machines also do not offer some of the amenities of real bodegas, such as alcohol, tobacco products, fresh sandwiches, or types of ethnic food local to particular New York neighborhoods. The CEO Paul Macdonald claimed that 97% of Hispanics surveyed did not find the term used for the machines offensive. Many bodega owners and employees do not see the startup as a particular threat. The CEO later apologized for causing offense and claimed that it was not his intent to put local bodegas out of business.

In July 2018, the company announced it was changing its name to Stockwell, citing the negative feedback around the original name as a motivator.

In June 2020, it was reported that Stockwell would shut down on July 1, but on August 13th, 2020, 365 Retail Markets announced it was acquiring the company for an undisclosed amount.

References

External links
 

Vending machine manufacturers
American companies established in 2017
2020 disestablishments in California
American companies disestablished in 2020
Companies based in Oakland, California